Svetlana Mikhailovna Pospelova (born December 24, 1979, in Saint Petersburg) is a Russian sprinter who primarily competes over 400 metres.

She was banned from competing in 2000 after she failed an out-of-competition test at the 2000 Summer Olympics. She received a two-year ban from the sport for the positive test for stanozolol.

International competitions

Personal bests
100 metres - 11.32 (2005)
200 metres - 22.39 (2005)
400 metres - 49.80 (2005)

See also
List of doping cases in athletics
List of European Athletics Indoor Championships medalists (women)
List of European Athletics Championships medalists (women)
List of people from Saint Petersburg

References

1979 births
Living people
Athletes from Saint Petersburg
Russian female sprinters
Olympic female sprinters
Olympic athletes of Russia
Athletes (track and field) at the 2000 Summer Olympics
World Athletics Championships athletes for Russia
World Athletics Championships medalists
World Athletics Championships winners
World Athletics Indoor Championships medalists
European Athletics Championships winners
European Athletics Championships medalists
European Athletics Indoor Championships winners
Russian Athletics Championships winners
Doping cases in athletics
Russian sportspeople in doping cases
20th-century Russian women
21st-century Russian women